Jeffrey Platt (born June 4, 1986) is an American sports commentator and professional poker player mostly known as being a member of the PokerGO break desk, and a sideline reporter for live tournaments such as the World Series of Poker, Poker Masters, and U.S. Poker Open. He is the host of several shows and podcasts for PokerGO and PokerNews, including No Gamble, No Future.

Early life and education 
Platt was born in Dallas, Texas, and attended Plano West High School. Platt attended the University of Southern California and graduated with a degree in broadcast journalism.

Career 
Platt worked as a sports anchor and reporter at CBS affiliate WJTV in Jackson, Mississippi, after graduation before returning to Dallas, Texas, to work for ESPN covering the Dallas Mavericks. Platt then joined Spectrum News San Antonio covering the San Antonio Spurs before finding his way into poker through his connections with Poker PROductions in 2018 which included working as a PokerNews reporter and hosting the PokerNews Podcast.

A partnership between Facebook Watch, Stadium, and PokerGO would see the debut of Friday Night Poker in September 2018 with Platt being joined by Brent Hanks to do play-by-play commentary, while Amanda Leatherman provided updates from the floor. The 13-week season gave fans the unique opportunity to engage in real-time with the hosts while watching the $5/$10 No-Limit Hold’em cash game with an ever-changing mix of players that included Daniel Negreanu, Antonio Esfandiari, Mike Matusow, Jennifer Harman, Bryn Kenney, Frank Kassela, Jennifer Tilly, Chris Moorman, Randall Emmett, Eli Elezra, and Phil Hellmuth.

In November 2019, Platt debuted his first show on PokerGO. The Big Blind was a blend of trivia and poker strategy with Platt hosting three contestants who answered poker-related questions but under a unique format that following a limit hold’em betting structure. Guests included Chris Moneymaker, Norm Macdonald, Mike Matusow, Norman Chad, Alex Jacob, Ben Yu, Matt Berkey, Prahlad Friedman, and Scott Vener. The winner of Season 1 was Chad who won $15,000 in prize money.

In March 2020, PokerGO announced that Platt would host The Championship Run that would walk the audience through momentous hands that led to the eventual victory of notable players’ marquee wins. The Championship Run covered wins from the World Series of Poker, Super High Roller Bowl, Poker Masters, and U.S. Poker Open.

In January 2021, Platt began co-hosting No Gamble, No Future with Brent Hanks. The show airs live on Tuesdays across PokerGO’s YouTube, Facebook, and Twitch channels. Guests so far have included Nick Schulman, Phil Hellmuth, Daniel Negreanu, and Antonio Esfandiari. 

In July 2022, No Gamble, No Future was announced as PokerGO's newest show that would provide cash game-focused entertainment. The show would be filmed at the PokerGO Studio with Platt and Hanks hosting. The season would run for 20 episodes on Tuesday evenings on PokerGO.

Poker career 
Platt began playing poker in 2008, and at the 2014 World Series of Poker he would breakout with a 203rd-place finish in the Main Event for $44,728. At the 2015 World Series of Poker, Platt finished 60th in the Main Event for $113,764.

Platt won his first career major tournament in a daily deepstack tournament at the 2017 World Series of Poker when he defeated 1,139 entrants to win $35,437.

In August 2019, Platt made his Poker After Dark debut during Season 10 on Open Seat week playing $25/$50 No-Limit Hold’em. In October 2019, Platt appeared on Showbound! week where he played in a $5,000 buy-in sit-n-go and finished in seventh-place.

In October, 2021, Platt finished in fourth-place in Event #43: $1,000 No-Limit Hold'em Double Stack at the 2021 World Series of Poker for $160,662.

In September 2022, Platt won the $1,100 No-Limit Hold'em MSPT Venetian for $100,804.

In October 2022, Platt won his first WSOP-Circuit Online ring in the $215 No-Limit Hold'em 6-Max for $18,689.

As of January 2023, his live tournament winnings exceed $605,000.

Personal life 
Platt currently lives in Las Vegas, Nevada, and is a passionate fan of the NBA and an avid Dallas Mavericks fan.

References 

Poker commentators
Living people
1986 births
USC Annenberg School for Communication and Journalism alumni
People from Dallas